The World Finance Tower is a 43 floor tower in the Pudong area of Shanghai and was completed in 2000. It was designed by architects Leigh & Orange.

References

See also
 List of tallest buildings in Shanghai

Office buildings completed in 2000
Postmodern architecture in China
Skyscraper office buildings in Shanghai
2000 establishments in China